C. balansae may refer to:
 Celtis balansae, a plant species endemic to New Caledonia
 Colchicum balansae, a flowering plant species native to Turkey and the Greek island of Rhodes
 Cycas balansae, a plant species native to China and Vietnam

See also 
 Balansae